Roy C. Craven (Roy Curtis Craven, Jr.) was (born in Cherokee Bluffs, Alabama on July 29, 1924. - May 30, 1996)  He was the founding director of the University Gallery at the University of Florida.

Roy C. Craven authored, co-authored, and co-created (as with contributing the prologue and serving as photographer for Indian Art of Ancient Florida ) numerous scholarly books and publications on art (which are used in class syllabi  and cited in other scholarly publications), including:
Indian Art: A Concise History
From the ocean of painting : India's popular paintings, 1589 to the present
Ceremonial centers of the Maya
Ten contemporary painters from India
A treasury of Indian miniature paintings
Ramayana: Pahari Paintings
A Concise History of Indian Art, "The World of Art Library" series
The Art of India from Florida Collections
Los Olmecas : the parent civilization of Mesoamerica
Indian sculpture in the John and Mable Ringling Museum of Art
Arts of India : selections from the Samuel P. Harn Museum of Art collection, University of Florida
Pre-Columbian pottery of Peru from the collection of the University Gallery
From fabled fields : selections from the Paddock family collection of Pre-Columbian art : an exhibition organized by the Norton Museum of Art, November 19, 1994-January 8, 1995
Of sky and earth : art of the early Southeastern Indians : October 1-November 28, 1982, the High Museum of Art, Atlanta, Georgia

References

External links
About the University Gallery at UF
Roy Craven's graduate thesis 
Oral history with Roy C. Craven by the Samuel Proctor Oral History Program
Guide to the Roy C. Craven, Jr. Photograph Collection housed in the UF Smathers Libraries

1924 births
1996 deaths
People from Tallapoosa County, Alabama
University of Florida faculty
American art historians
Historians of Indian art